Endotricha pyrosalis is a moth of the family Pyralidae described by Achille Guenée in 1854. It is found in Australia and is common in Sydney and Melbourne.

The wingspan is about 20 mm.

References 

Moths described in 1854
Endotrichini
Moths of Australia
Taxa named by Achille Guenée